Wanliu Area, or Haidian Town, formerly Haidian Township is a town, more precisely area, of Haidian District, Beijing, located immediately to the east of Kunming Lake. As of 2020, it had a total population of 2,022.

History

Administrative Divisions 
At the end of 2021, Wanliu Area was subdivided into 5 divisions, including 2 communities, 2 villages, and 1 residential area for an economic cooperative:

See also
List of township-level divisions of Beijing

References

Towns in Beijing
Haidian District
Areas of Beijing